This List of navigation authorities in the United States is a link list for any navigation authority in the United States.

U.S. government
United States Army Corps of Engineers
United States Coast Guard
United States Department of Homeland Security
Bureau of Navigation
Bureau of Marine Inspection and Navigation
Office of Coast Survey
National Oceanic and Atmospheric Administration

Individual navigation authorities in the US
Arkansas River Navigation System
California Debris Commission
Mississippi River Commission
New York State Canal System, New York State Canal Corporation, New York State Thruway Authority
Saint Lawrence Seaway Development Corporation
Tennessee Valley Authority (1936)

External links
U.S. Coast Guard Navigation Center website

See also
List of navigation authorities in the United Kingdom

Rivers of the United States
Water transportation in the United States